HMS Queen Elizabeth could refer to one of three ships named in honour of Elizabeth I of England:
  was the lead ship of the s, launched in 1913 and scrapped in 1948
 HMS Queen Elizabeth was to have been the first of the 1960s planned CVA-01-class aircraft carriers, but the class was never constructed
  is the first ship of the s, launched in 2014, on sea trials as of June 2017 and commissioned in December 2017

Battle honours
 Dardanelles 1915
 Crete 1941
 Sabang 1944
 Burma 1944–45
 East Indies 1945

See also

References
 

Royal Navy ship names